Acla's Descent into Floristella (Italian: La discesa di Aclà a Floristella) is a 1992 Italian drama film written and directed by Aurelio Grimaldi. It entered the competition at the 49th Venice International Film Festival.

Cast 

 Francesco Cusimano: Aclà 
 Tony Sperandeo: Caramazza
 Luigi Maria Burruano: Father of Aclà
 Lucia Sardo: Mother of Aclà

References

External links

1992 films
Italian drama films
1992 drama films
Films directed by Aurelio Grimaldi
Films set in Sicily
Films about child abuse
1992 directorial debut films
1990s Italian-language films
1990s Italian films